Wibu-Systems GmbH is a software manufacturer founded in 1989, specialising in software licensing and digital rights management.

Their flagship product is CodeMeter, either a dongle or plugin which controls licensing for many software packages.

References

Computer security software companies